Super Cool EP is the second extended play from Japanese girl group Empire. It was released on August 5, 2020, by Avex. The album consists of seven tracks.

Track listing

Charts

References

2020 EPs
Empire (Japanese band) albums
Japanese-language EPs